Timothy Starks was a professional football player for the Minnesota Vikings in 1987 when he was 24 years old. He attended Kent State. He played defensive back. He is 5'9" and weighs 175lbs. He was born on December 30, 1963, in Mobile, Alabama.

References 
 Timothy Starks

1964 births
Living people
Sportspeople from Mobile, Alabama
Kent State University alumni
Players of American football from Alabama
Minnesota Vikings players
National Football League replacement players